The Anjouan brush warbler (Nesillas longicaudata) is a species of Old World warbler in the family Acrocephalidae. Clements lumps this bird into the Malagasy brush warbler.
It is found in the Comoros and Mayotte.

References

Anjouan brush warbler
Anjouan
Endemic birds of the Comoros
Birds of Mayotte
Anjouan brush warbler
Anjouan brush warbler
Taxonomy articles created by Polbot
Taxobox binomials not recognized by IUCN